Plagiorchis is a genus of parasitic trematodes (flukes) in the family Plagiorchiidae.

References 

Plagiorchiidae
Plagiorchiida genera